Catherine McGregor (born June 8, 1955) was an educator and political figure in British Columbia. She represented Kamloops in the Legislative Assembly of British Columbia from 1996 to 2001 as a New Democratic Party (NDP) member.

She was educated at the University of Victoria and Simon Fraser University. McGregor taught elementary school for 19 years and also served as a teacher librarian. She served in the provincial cabinet as Minister of Municipal Affairs, as Minister of Environment, Lands and Parks and as Minister of Advanced Education, Training and Technology and Minister Responsible for Youth. In 1999 she announced a $2million allocation for B.C. provincial park system. McGregor was defeated by Claude Richmond when she ran for reelection in 2001.

She continues to be involved in education as the Associate Professor in the School of Educational Psychology and Leadership Studies and Associate Dean of Graduate Programs and Research at University of Victoria.

References 

1955 births
Living people
British Columbia New Democratic Party MLAs
Canadian librarians
Canadian women librarians
Canadian schoolteachers
Women government ministers of Canada
Members of the Executive Council of British Columbia
Politicians from Victoria, British Columbia
Simon Fraser University alumni
Academic staff of the University of Northern British Columbia
University of Victoria alumni
Academic staff of the University of Victoria
Women MLAs in British Columbia
21st-century Canadian politicians
21st-century Canadian women politicians